Streptomyces otsuchiensis is a bacterium species from the genus of Streptomyces which has been isolated from marine sediments from the Otsuchi Bay in Japan. Streptomyces otsuchiensis produces biosurfactant.

See also 
 List of Streptomyces species

References 

otsuchiensis
Bacteria described in 2021